Pinsiam Sor.Amnuaysirichoke (ปิ่นสยาม ส.อำนวยศิริโชค) is a Thai Muay Thai fighter living in Japan since 2011.

Titles and accomplishments
Battle of MuayThai
 2022 BoM Super Featherweight Champion

Hosst Cup
 2020 Hoost Cup Japan Lightweight Champion

Martial Arts Japan Kickboxing Federation
 2014 MAJKF Featherweight Champion

Lumpinee Stadium
 2007 Lumpinee Stadium 122 lbs Champion
 2004 Lumpinee Stadium 118 lbs Champion
 2004 Lumpinee Stadium Fighter of the Year
 2004 Lumpinee Stadium Fight of the Year (vs. Ngatao Attharungroj)

Omnoi Stadium
 Omnoi Stadium 118 lbs Champion
 2002 Isuzu Cup Tournament Winner

Fight record

|-  style="background:#cfc;"
| 2022-09-23|| Win || align=left| Ryuya Kawahara ||  The Battle of Muay Thai "OUROBOROS" || Tokyo, Japan ||Decision (Unanimous) || 3 ||3:00 
|-  style="background:#cfc;"
| 2022-07-03|| Win|| align=left| Takehiko Umezawa ||  BOM 36 || Yokohama, Japan || Decision (Unanimous) || 5 ||3:00 
|-
! style=background:white colspan=9 |
|-  style="background:#cfc;"
| 2022-04-24|| Win || align=left| Raiyaman ||  BOM WAVE 08 – Get Over The COVID-19 || Beppu, Japan || TKO (Punches) ||2  || 
|-  style="background:#cfc;"
| 2021-07-11 || Win || align=left| Hiro Yamato || NJKF - Yamato Gym 50th Anniversary Yamato Matsuri  || Nagoya, Japan || Decision (Unanimous) || 3 || 3:00
|-  bgcolor="#cfc"
| 2020-12-27 || Win||align=left| Yohei Sakurai|| HOOST CUP KINGS NAGOYA 8 || Nagoya, Japan || Decision (Unanimous) || 3 || 3:00 
|-
! style=background:white colspan=9 |
|-  bgcolor="#cfc"
| 2020-10-18 || Win ||align=left| Junpei Hisai || HOOST CUP KINGS OSAKA 5 || Osaka, Japan || Decision (Majority) ||3 ||3:00
|-  bgcolor="#cfc"
| 2019-12-15 || Win||align=left| Henry Cejas|| HOOST CUP KINGS NAGOYA 7 || Nagoya, Japan || Ext.R Decision (Split) || 4 || 3:00
|-  bgcolor="#cfc"
| 2018-09-24 || Win||align=left| Tatsumi || Suk Wanchai MuayThai Super Fight vol.5 || Nagoya, Japan || TKO || 3 ||
|-  bgcolor="#cfc"
| 2018-05-20 || Win||align=left| Fabricio Zacarias || HOOST CUP KINGS NAGOYA 4 || Nagoya, Japan || Decision (Unanimous)  || 3 || 3:00
|-  bgcolor="#fbb"
| 2017-12-10 || Loss ||align=left| Yota Shigemori || KNOCK OUT 2017 in Ryogoku || Tokyo, Japan || Decision (Unanimous)  || 5 || 3:00
|-  bgcolor="#cfc"
| 2017-09-30 || Win||align=left| Yuma Yamaguchi || HOOST CUP～KINGS NAGOYA 3～ || Nagoya, Japan || Decision (Unanimous)  || 3 || 3:00
|-  bgcolor="#cfc"
| 2017-08-06 || Win||align=left| Chao Rocket || Suk Wanchai Muay Thai Super Fight || Nagoya, Japan || Decision (Unanimous)  || 5 || 3:00
|-  bgcolor="#cfc"
| 2016-12-04 || Win||align=left| Hideki Kuze || BOM The Battle Of Muaythai XIII || Kanagawa, Japan || Decision (Unanimous)  || 5 || 3:00
|-  bgcolor="#cfc"
| 2016-06-19 || Win||align=left| Gong Yuankun || Wanchai + Kingthong Muay Thai Super Fight|| Nagoya, Japan || TKO (Punches)  || 4 || 2:15
|-  bgcolor="#cfc"
| 2016-04-10 || Win||align=left| Fumihiro Uesugi|| MAJKF Murakami Vol.1 || Aichi Prefecture, Japan || Decision (Majority)  || 3 || 3:00
|-  bgcolor="#cfc"
| 2015-12-27 || Win||align=left| Yuya || HOOST CUP～KINGS NAGOYA～ || Nagoya, Japan || Decision (Unanimous)  || 3 || 3:00
|-  bgcolor="#cfc"
| 2015-10-03 || Win||align=left| Naguranchun Masa M16 || SHOOT BOXING THE LAST BOMB || Osaka, Japan || TKO   || 3 || 1:52
|-  bgcolor="#cfc"
| 2015-07-19 || Win||align=left| Hisaaki Nakamukai|| MAJKF TRADITION.4 || Tokyo, Japan || TKO (3 Knockdowns)  || 2 || 2:40
|-  bgcolor="#cfc"
| 2015-05-02 || Win||align=left| Yosuke Morii || ZONE 2 || Kanagawa, Japan || Decision (Majority)  || 5 || 3:00
|-  bgcolor="#cfc"
| 2014-12-27 || Win|| align=left| Heihachi Nakajima || HOOST CUP forever || Nagoya, Japan ||  Decision (Unanimous) || 3 || 3:00
|-  bgcolor="#cfc"
| 2014-11-16 || Win|| align=left| Koij Ikegami || HOOST CUP KINGS WEST || Osaka, Japan || Ext.R Decision (Unanimous) || 4 || 3:00
|-  bgcolor="#cfc"
| 2014-08-10 || Win|| align=left| Ikki || MAJKF KICK GUTS 2014 || Tokyo, Japan || Decision (Unanimous) || 5 || 3:00
|-
! style=background:white colspan=9 |
|-  bgcolor="#cfc"
| 2014-06-22 || Win || align=left| King Kohei || HOOST CUP・SPIRIT4 || Kyoto, Japan || TKO || 1 || 2:10
|-  bgcolor="#cfc"
| 2014-04-13 || Win || align=left| Kosuke Komiyama || MAJKF DRAGON.5 ～THE ONE AND ONLY～ || Tokyo, Japan || Decision (Majority) || 3 || 3:00
|-  bgcolor="#cfc"
| 2014-01-19 || Win|| align=left| Ryo Pegasus || MAJKF DRAGON.4 ～THE ONE AND ONLY～ || Tokyo, Japan || TKO || 2 || 0:58
|-
! style=background:white colspan=9 |
|-  bgcolor="#cfc"
| 2013-08-10 || Win|| align=left| Motoki || MAJKF KICK GUTS 2013 || Tokyo, Japan || KO || 2 || 0:46
|-  bgcolor="#c5d2ea"
| 2013-06-16 || Draw|| align=left| Daichi Yamato|| HOOST CUP KINGS || Nagoya, Japan || Decision || 3 || 3:00
|-  bgcolor="#cfc"
| 2013-04-14 || Win|| align=left| Kenryu || MAJKF DRAGON ROAD ONE AND ONLY TAKE 1 || Kanagawa, Japan || KO || 2 || 0:50
|-  bgcolor="#cfc"
| 2013-02-24 || Win|| align=left| Fukashi || HOOST CUP || Aichi, Japan || Decision (Unanimous) || 3 || 3:00
|- style="background:#fbb;"
| 2012-09-09|| Loss||align=left| Sota Ichinohe || M-1 Muay Thai Challenge Sutt Yod Muaythai vol.3 Part 2|| Aichi Prefecture, Japan || Decision (Unanimous) || 5 || 3:00
|- style="background:#c5d2ea;"
| 2012-07-15|| Draw||align=left| Keisuke Miyamoto || MAJKF KICK GUTS 2012 ||  Tokyo, Japan || Decision || 3 || 3:00
|-  style="background:#fbb;"
| 2012-03-31 ||Loss ||align=left| Tapaotong Eminentair || Ladprao Stadium  || Bangkok, Thailand || KO ||4  ||
|- style="background:#fbb;"
| 2011-07-24|| Loss||align=left| Hiroki Akimoto || MAJKF J-1 time ～signal of start～|| Aichi Prefecture, Japan || KO (Left Hook to the Body) || 2 || 0:54
|-  style="background:#fbb;"
| 2011-07-02|| Loss ||align=left| Rungphet Wor Rungniran  || Channel 7 Stadium || Bangkok, Thailand || Decision ||5 || 3:00

|-  style="background:#cfc;"
| 2010- || Win ||align=left| Rittidet Wor.Wantawee || Lumpinee Stadium || Bangkok, Thailand || Decision || 5 || 3:00
|-  style="background:#fbb;"
| 2010-08-04 || Loss ||align=left| Pakorn P.K. Saenchai Muaythaigym || Rajadamnern Stadium || Bangkok, Thailand || Decision || 5 || 3:00
|-  style="background:#cfc;"
| 2010-06-06 || Win||align=left| Suntipap Sit-Au-Ubon || Channel 7 Stadium || Bangkok, Thailand || KO (Elbow)|| 3 ||
|-  style="background:#fbb;"
| 2009-12 || Loss||align=left| Wanchalerm Sitzornong || Lumpinee Stadium || Bangkok, Thailand || Decision || 5 || 3:00
|-
! style=background:white colspan=9 |
|-  style="background:#c5d2ea;"
| 2009-10-27|| Draw||align=left| Penake Sitnumnoi || Lumpinee Stadium || Bangkok, Thailand || Decision|| 5 || 3:00
|-  style="background:#cfc;"
| 2009-09-18 || Win||align=left| Wanchalerm Sitzornong || Lumpinee Stadium || Bangkok, Thailand || Decision || 5 || 3:00
|-  style="background:#cfc;"
| 2009-08-16 || Win||align=left| Santipap Santi-Ubon || Channel 7 Stadium || Bangkok, Thailand || Decision || 5 || 3:00
|-  style="background:#cfc;"
| 2009-06-21 || Win||align=left| Arashi Fujihara|| AJKF Norainu Dengekisakusen 2009|| Tokyo, Japan || KO (Right Cross)|| 3 || 1:30
|-  style="background:#fbb;"
| 2009-04-07 || Loss||align=left| Penek Sitnumnoi || Lumpinee Stadium|| Bangkok, Thailand || Decision || 5 || 3:00
|-  style="background:#fbb;"
| 2009-03-17 || Loss ||align=left| Wanchalerm Sitzornong || Lumpinee Stadium || Bangkok, Thailand || Decision || 5 || 3:00
|-  style="background:#cfc;"
| 2008-12-07 || Win||align=left| Petchdam Kiatsoranan || Lumpinee Stadium || Bangkok, Thailand || Decision || 5 || 3:00
|-  style="background:#fbb;"
| 2008-04-25 || Loss||align=left| Karnchai K.Bangkui || Rajadamnern Stadium || Bangkok, Thailand || Decision || 5 || 3:00
|-  style="background:#c5d2ea;"
| 2008-03-25 || Draw||align=left| Karnchai K.Bangkui || Lumpinee Stadium || Bangkok, Thailand || Decision || 5 || 3:00
|-  style="background:#cfc;"
| 2008-02-19 || Win||align=left| Ninmongkol Kaenorasing || Lumpinee Stadium || Bangkok, Thailand || Decision || 5 || 3:00
|-  style="background:#cfc;"
| 2008-01-25 || Win||align=left| Uranus Phetpayathai || Lumpinee Stadium || Bangkok, Thailand || Decision || 5 || 3:00
|-  style="background:#cfc;"
| 2007-11-30 || Win ||align=left| Santipap SitUbon || Lumpinee Stadium || Bangkok, Thailand ||Decision || 5 || 3:00
|-  style="background:#fbb;"
| 2007-09-07 || Loss ||align=left| Pansak Luk Bor.Kor || Lumpinee Stadium || Bangkok, Thailand || Decision || 5 || 3:00
|-
! style=background:white colspan=9 |

|-  style="background:#fbb;"
| 2007-06-26 || Loss ||align=left| Ninmongkol Kaenorasing || Lumpinee Stadium || Bangkok, Thailand || Decision || 5 || 3:00

|-  style="background:#fbb;"
| 2007-04-24 ||Loss ||align=left| Captainken Narupai || Lumpinee Stadium || Bangkok, Thailand || Decision || 5 ||3:00

|-  style="background:#cfc;"
| 2007-03-02 || Win||align=left| Pokaew Fonjangchonburi || Lumpinee Stadium || Bangkok, Thailand || Decision || 5 || 3:00
|-
! style=background:white colspan=9 |

|-  style="background:#fbb;"
| 2006-10-06 ||Loss ||align=left| Wuttidet Lukprabat ||  Eminentair, Lumpinee Stadium || Bangkok, Thailand || Decision || 5 || 3:00

|-  style="background:#cfc;"
| 2006-08-29 ||Win ||align=left| Pornsanae Sitmonchai || Lumpinee Stadium || Bangkok, Thailand || Decision || 5 || 3:00
|-  style="background:#fbb;"
| 2006-08-15 ||Loss ||align=left| Sagetdao Petpayathai || Lumpinee Stadium || Bangkok, Thailand || Decision || 5 || 3:00
|-  style="background:#cfc;"
| 2006- ||Win ||align=left| Khunsuk Sit Kriangkrai || Lumpinee Stadium || Bangkok, Thailand || Decision || 5 || 3:00
|-  bgcolor="#fbb"
| 2006- || Loss||align=left| Petchmanee Phetsupaphan || Lumpinee Stadium || Bangkok, Thailand || Decision || 5 || 3:00
|-  style="background:#fbb;"
| 2006-01-27 || Loss||align=left| Karnchai K.Bangkui || Lumpinee Stadium || Bangkok, Thailand || Decision || 5 || 3:00
|-
! style=background:white colspan=9 |
|-  style="background:#c5d2ea;"
| 2005-12-16 || Draw||align=left| Karnchai Chor.Sangprapai|| Lumpinee Stadium || Bangkok, Thailand || Decision || 5 || 3:00
|-  style="background:#fbb;"
| 2005-10-24 ||Loss ||align=left| Wuttidet Lukprabat ||  || Phetchaburi Province, Thailand || Decision (Split) || 5 || 3:00
|-
! style=background:white colspan=9 |

|-  style="background:#fbb;"
| 2005-08-26 ||Loss ||align=left| Captainken Narupai || Lumpinee Stadium || Bangkok, Thailand || TKO || 2 ||
|-  style="background:#cfc;"
| 2005-05-27 || Win ||align=left| Anantachai Lukbanyai|| Lumpinee Stadium || Bangkok, Thailand || Decision || 5 || 3:00
|-
! style=background:white colspan=9 |
|-  style="background:#fbb;"
| 2004-12-07 || Loss||align=left| Duangsompong Por.Khumpai || Lumpinee Stadium || Bangkok, Thailand || Decision || 5 || 3:00
|-
! style=background:white colspan=9 |

|-  style="background:#c5d2ea;"
| 2004-11-02 || Draw ||align=left| Wuttidet Lukprabat || Lumpinee Stadium || Bangkok, Thailand || Decision || 5 || 3:00

|-  style="background:#cfc;"
| 2004-09-10 || Win ||align=left| Ngatao Attharungroj || Lumpinee Stadium || Bangkok, Thailand || Decision || 5 || 3:00
|-  style="background:#cfc;"
| 2004-08-17 || Win ||align=left| Petcheak Sitjawai || Lumpinee Stadium || Bangkok, Thailand || Decision || 5 || 3:00
|-
! style=background:white colspan=9 |
|-  style="background:#cfc;"
| 2004-07-23 || Win ||align=left| Pornsiri WindySport || Lumpinee Stadium || Bangkok, Thailand || Decision || 5 || 3:00

|-  style="background:#cfc;"
| 2004-06- || Win ||align=left| Captainken Narupai || Lumpinee Stadium || Bangkok, Thailand || Decision || 5 || 3:00

|-  style="background:#fbb;"
| 2004-05-|| Loss ||align=left| Panomroonglek Kiatmoo9||Lumpinee Stadium || Bangkok, Thailand || Decision || 5 || 3:00

|-  style="background:#cfc;"
| 2004- || Win ||align=left| Sanchoenglek Jirakriangkrai || Channel 7 Stadium || Bangkok, Thailand || Decision || 5 || 3:00

|-  style="background:#cfc;"
| 2004-01-30 || Win ||align=left| Thepbancha Tor.Sunonwipat || Lumpinee Stadium || Bangkok, Thailand || Decision || 5 || 3:00
|-  bgcolor="#fbb"
| 2003-09-19 || Loss ||align=left| Kaew Fairtex || Petchpiya Fights, Lumpinee Stadium || Bangkok, Thailand || Decision  || 5 || 3:00
|-  style="background:#cfc;"
| 2003-08-29 ||Win||align=left| Pornsanae Sitmonchai || Lumpinee Stadium || Bangkok, Thailand || Decision || 5 || 3:00
|-  style="background:#cfc;"
| 2003-07-04 ||Win ||align=left| Pornsanae Sitmonchai || Lumpinee Stadium || Bangkok, Thailand || Decision || 5 || 3:00

|-  style="background:#cfc;"
| 2003-05-02 ||Win ||align=left| Naruenat ChengsitewGym || Lumpinee Stadium || Bangkok, Thailand || Decision || 5 || 3:00

|-  style="background:#fbb;"
| 2003- || Loss ||align=left| Phetek Kiatyongyut || || Ko Samui, Thailand || Decision || 5 || 3:00

|-  style="background:#fbb;"
| 2002-07-27 || Loss||align=left| Pokaew Sit Chafuang ||  Omnoi Stadium || Samut Sakhon, Thailand || Decision || 5 || 3:00
|-  style="background:#cfc;"
| 2002-06-28 || Win||align=left| Dewid Lukmahanak ||  Lumpinee Stadium || Bangkok, Thailand || Decision || 5 || 3:00
|-  style="background:#cfc;"
| 2002-03-30 || Win ||align=left| Wansongkram Or.Phanatnikhom || Omnoi Stadium - Isuzu Cup Final || Samut Sakhon, Thailand || Decision || 5 || 3:00 
|-
! style=background:white colspan=9 |

|-  style="background:#cfc;"
| 2002- || Win ||align=left| Roichoeng Sor Ruangsiri || Omnoi Stadium - Isuzu Cup Semi Final || Samut Sakhon, Thailand || Decision || 5 || 3:00 

|-  style="background:#cfc;"
| 2002- || Win ||align=left| Yuttajak Kaewsamrit || Omnoi Stadium - Isuzu Cup Quarter Final|| Samut Sakhon, Thailand || Decision || 5 || 3:00 

|-  style="background:#cfc;"
| 2001- || Win ||align=left| Roichoeng Sor Ruangsiri || Omnoi Stadium - Isuzu Cup || Samut Sakhon, Thailand || Decision || 5 || 3:00 

|-  style="background:#cfc;"
| 2001- || Win ||align=left| Khantiphong Tor.Pitakkolkan || Omnoi Stadium - Isuzu Cup || Samut Sakhon, Thailand || Decision || 5 || 3:00 

|-  style="background:#cfc;"
| 2001-09-22 || Win ||align=left| Ramsainoi Kiatnaphachai || Omnoi Stadium - Isuzu Cup || Samut Sakhon, Thailand || Decision || 5 || 3:00 

|-  bgcolor="#fbb"
| 2001-04-01 || Loss||align=left| Petchmanee Phetsupaphan || Channel 7 Stadium || Bangkok, Thailand || Decision  || 5 || 3:00
|-  style="background:#fbb;"
| 2001-03- || Loss||align=left| Kangwanlek Petchyindee ||  Lumpinee Stadium || Bangkok, Thailand || Decision || 5 || 3:00
|-  style="background:#fbb;"
| 2001-02-20 || Loss||align=left| Kangwanlek Petchyindee ||  Lumpinee Stadium || Bangkok, Thailand || Decision || 5 || 3:00
|-  bgcolor="#fbb"
| 2001-02-03 || Loss ||align=left| Fahsuchon Sit-O || Lumpinee Stadium || Bangkok, Thailand || Decision  || 5 || 3:00
|-  bgcolor="#cfc"
| 2000-10-21 || Win ||align=left| Sankomsak Phanu || Lumpinee Stadium || Bangkok, Thailand || Decision  || 5 || 3:00
|-  bgcolor="#cfc"
| 2000-09-24 || Win ||align=left| Sakuawut Kiatthawan || Samrong Stadium || Thailand || Decision  || 5 || 3:00
|-  bgcolor="#fbb"
| 2000-06-02 || Loss ||align=left| Yodradap Kiatphayathai || Lumpinee Stadium || Bangkok, Thailand || Decision  || 5 || 3:00
|-  bgcolor="#fbb"
| 2000-03-14 || Loss ||align=left| Sakuawut Kiatthawan || Lumpinee Stadium || Bangkok, Thailand || Decision  || 5 || 3:00
|-  bgcolor="#fbb"
| 1999-08-07 || Loss ||align=left| Chanaphet Naratrikul || Rajadamnern Stadium || Bangkok, Thailand || Decision  || 5 || 3:00
|-  bgcolor="#fbb"
| 1999-06-12 || Loss ||align=left| Rungrit Sitlamuang || Lumpinee Stadium || Bangkok, Thailand || Decision  || 5 || 3:00
|-
| colspan=9 | Legend:

References

Pinsiam Sor.Amnuaysirichoke
Living people
1980 births
Pinsiam Sor.Amnuaysirichoke